Juha Veijonen (born 29 August 1959) is a Finnish film actor. He appeared in more than sixty films since 1990.

Selected filmography

References

External links
 

1959 births
Living people
Male actors from Helsinki
Finnish male film actors
Finnish male television actors